The sixth season of the American comedy-drama television series Younger was ordered by TV Land in June 2018. It aired from June 12 to September 4, 2019, and revolves around the lead Liza Miller, who has to manage her career in the publishing industry having faked her identity as a younger woman to get her job, whereas her romantic and professional lives are marked by ups and comings. Sutton Foster stars as Miller, with Debi Mazar, Miriam Shor, Nico Tortorella, Hilary Duff, Molly Bernard, Peter Hermann and Charles Michael Davis also returning from the fifth season. The season was produced by Darren Star Productions and Jax Media, with Star serving as showrunner. Younger was renewed for a seventh season on July 24, 2019, making it the longest running original series in the network's history.

Cast

Main 
 Sutton Foster as Liza Miller
 Debi Mazar as Maggie Amato
 Miriam Shor as Diana Trout
 Nico Tortorella as Josh
 Hilary Duff as Kelsey Peters
 Molly Bernard as Lauren Heller
 Peter Hermann as Charles Brooks
 Charles Michael Davis as Zane Anders

Recurring 
 Chris Tardio as Enzo De Luca 
 Phoebe Dynevor as Clare 
 Laura Benanti as Quinn Tyler 
 Annaleigh Ashford as Shelly Rozansky

Guest 
 Michael Urie as Redmond 
 Grant Shaud as Bob Katz 
 Willa Fitzgerald as Audrey Colbert 
 Nicole Ari Parker as Beth 
 Becky Ann Baker as Bronwyn Madigan 
 Mark Deklin as Cameron Butler 
 Cady Huffman as Nurse Maureen 
 Lou Taylor Pucci as Travis Jason 
 Teddy Coluca as Uncle Joe 
 Stephanie DiMaggio as Valentina 
 Heidi Armbruster as Michelle 
 Maddie Corman as Julie 
 Becca Lish as Mrs. Klepper 
 Jennifer Westfeldt as Pauline Turner-Brooks 
 Oded Fehr as Rafa 
 Pat Kiernan as himself 
 Delphina Belle as Nicole Brooks 
 Jeté Laurence as Bianca Brooks 
 Cliff Bemis as Ennis Jacobs 
 William Ragsdale as Jeffrey Jacobs 
 Carrie St. Louis as Alice Dwyer

Episodes

Production 
TV Land renewed Younger for a sixth season in June 2018, ahead of the fifth season's premiere. The first table-read took place on February 15, 2019, whilst filming commenced in the following week. Miriam Shor directed one episode of the season, summing two installments directed by her on Younger. TV Land president Kevin Ray affirmed that the season would focus on the relationship between the characters of Liza and Charles. In the season's first official trailer, series creator Darren Star revealed that it would also chronicle Empirical Press' workplace and inside relations. Younger was renewed for a seventh season on July 24, 2019.

Release

Broadcast 
Younger's sixth season premiered on June 12, 2019, and concluded after twelve episodes on September 4. In September 2018, it was announced that the series was moving from TV Land to Paramount Network, airing during Thursdays. However, in April 2019, it was announced that it would stay on TV Land, airing on Wednesdays.

Marketing 
An official trailer for the sixth season was released on April 17, 2019. On June 9, 2019, the season premiere was screened at the ATX Television Festival in Austin, Texas, followed by an interview with cast member Debi Mazar and writers Sarah Choi and Joe Murphy.

Reception

Ratings 
Upon its airing, the first episode became the series' highest-rated season premiere ever in the P25-54 and W25-54 demos. It scored a 1.21 rating and logged 457,000 viewers among women aging 25–54, up 30 percent from the fifth season's premiere. Among people aging 25–54, the episode was watched by 601,000 viewers, up 29 percent from the previous year. The season premiere drew 1.3 million total viewers, up 23 percent among total viewers from season five.

Critical response 
On review aggregator Rotten Tomatoes, the season has an approval rating of 100% with an average rating of 7.94/10, based on eight reviews. While reviewing the first two episodes of the season, Jen Chaney from New York magazine's website Vulture.com praised Younger's consistency and ability to maintain its entertainment. The writer commented, "Six seasons in, Younger remains a fizzy New York fantasy that’s light without sacrificing its intelligence, a pleasure that comes with no residual guilt whatsoever." Melanie McFarland from website Salon glorified the series' approach on ageism, writing, "There's a lot to appreciate about how accessible this series made its conversations about age discrimination in the workplace and society at large, and hopefully others will draw influence from its blend of intelligence and lightheartedness." In a positive review, Christopher James from Awards Circuit singled out the series' approach of women in positions of power and ageism. He also lauded Duff's performance as Kelsey and the character story lines, as well as Shor's portrayal of Diana. Conversely, the author criticized the devaluation of the characters of Josh, Maggie, and Lauren. Overall, he wrote, "When the show concentrates on being a workplace comedy about the challenges of being a female executive, Younger truly excels."

References

External links 

 
 

2019 American television seasons